The 2014 Dunlop World Challenge was a professional tennis tournament played on indoor carpet courts. It was the 7th edition of the tournament which was part of the 2014 ATP Challenger Tour and the 2014 ITF Women's Circuit, offering a total of $75,000+H for women and $40,000+H for men in prize money respectively. It took place in Toyota, Japan, on 17–23 November 2014.

Men's entrants

Seeds 

 1 Rankings as of 10 November 2014

Other entrants 
The following players received wildcards into the singles main draw:
  Sho Katayama
  Hiroki Kondo
  Arata Onozawa
  Yusuke Watanuki

The following players received entry from the qualifying draw:
  Mikhail Elgin
  Gong Maoxin
  Shintaro Imai
  Nam Ji-sung

The following player received entry into the singles main draw as a lucky loser:
  Hiroyasu Ehara

The following player received entry from a protected ranking:
  Greg Jones

Women's entrants

Seeds 

 1 Rankings as of 10 November 2014

Other entrants 
The following players received wildcards into the singles main draw:
  Miyu Kato
  Ksenia Lykina
  Mari Tanaka
  Yuuki Tanaka

The following players received entry from the qualifying draw:
  Kanae Hisami
  Tori Kinard
  Ayaka Okuno
  Akiko Omae

The following player received entry into the singles main draw as a lucky loser:
  Yuka Higuchi

The following player received entry from a protected ranking:
  Chang Kai-chen

Champions

Men's singles 

  Go Soeda def.  Tatsuma Ito 6–4, 7–5

Women's singles 

  An-Sophie Mestach def.  Shuko Aoyama 6–1, 6–1

Men's doubles 

  Toshihide Matsui /  Yasutaka Uchiyama def.  Bumpei Sato /  Yang Tsung-hua 7–6(8–6), 6–2

Women's doubles 

  Eri Hozumi /  Makoto Ninomiya def.  Shuko Aoyama /  Junri Namigata 6–3, 7–5

External links 
  
 2014 Dunlop World Challenge at ITFtennis.com

 
2014
2014 ITF Women's Circuit
2014 ATP Challenger Tour
November 2014 sports events in Asia
2014 in Japanese tennis